Hobartville is a suburb of Richmond, in the state of New South Wales, Australia.

Hobartville was originally a horse stud and was subdivided in the 1960s with the first houses built in 1969.  Hobartville Public School was opened in 1971 and the Hobartville Shopping Centre was opened in 1978.

Population
At the 2016 census, there were 2744 residents in Hobartville. More than 80% of people were born in Australia and the most common ancestries were English, Australian, and Irish. The top responses for religious affiliation were No Religion 26.0%, Anglican 24.2%, and Catholic 21.7%. Almost all dwellings were detached houses and most of these had 3 or more bedrooms. The median monthly mortgage payment was $1890 which was higher than the national figure of $1755.

References

Suburbs of Sydney
City of Hawkesbury